Al Osborne (born 8 March 1947 in Weston, Ontario) is a retired professional Canadian ice hockey player who was selected in the first round (4th overall) of the 1963 NHL Amateur Draft.

Osborne was a 16-year-old playing junior B hockey in the Weston, Ontario when he was selected fourth overall by the New York Rangers in the first ever NHL amateur draft. He played three seasons (1964–67) in the Ontario Hockey Association with the Toronto Marlboros before turning professional with the Omaha Knights for the 1967-68 season in the Central Professional Hockey League. He split the following season playing in both the American Hockey League and the Eastern Hockey League where he played with the Buffalo Bisons and Salem Rebels respectively.

Osborne continued to play Senior ice hockey the next eight seasons (1969–77) in the OHA Senior A League where he suited up with the Orillia Terriers, Brantford Foresters,  Cambridge Hornets, and Brantford Alexanders.

Career statistics

References

External links
 

1947 births
Buffalo Bisons (AHL) players
Canadian ice hockey right wingers
Living people
National Hockey League first-round draft picks
New York Rangers draft picks
Omaha Knights (CHL) players
Salem Rebels players
Ice hockey people from Toronto
Toronto Marlboros players